is a Japanese basketball player. He competed in the men's tournament at the 1976 Summer Olympics.

References

1954 births
Living people
Japanese men's basketball players
Olympic basketball players of Japan
Basketball players at the 1976 Summer Olympics
Sportspeople from Nagano Prefecture
Asian Games medalists in basketball
Asian Games silver medalists for Japan
Basketball players at the 1982 Asian Games
Medalists at the 1982 Asian Games